Newchurch is a village and civil parish on the Isle of Wight. It is located between Sandown and Newport in the southeast of the island. Anthony Dillington, owner of the Knighton Gorges Manor in Newchurch wrote to his son Robert in 1574 that, "This is the very Garden of England, and we be privileged to work in it as Husbandmen......."
Newchurch obtained its name from the new church built in 1087 by the Norman monks of Lyra. The Newchurch Parish for many centuries stretched from the north to south coasts of the Island; by the early Nineteenth Century the growing resort towns of Ventnor and Ryde were included within its boundaries. The present day parish includes Newchurch Village, Apse Heath, Winford, Whiteley Bank, Alverstone, Alverstone Garden Village, Queen's Bower, Princelett and Mersley.

Public transport is provided by Wightbus bus route 23, operating between Newport and Shanklin. The Sustrans route 23 cycle route also runs through the village at the bottom of the Shute, allowing easy access to Cowes, Newport and Sandown. Between 1875 and 1956 Newchurch had the advantage of a railway station. There is a pub called "The Pointer Inn" and a sub-post office.

See also
All Saints' Church, Newchurch

References

External links

Newchurch Community web site

Villages on the Isle of Wight
Civil parishes in the Isle of Wight